Lone Pine Airport  is a public airport located one mile (1.6 km) southeast of Lone Pine (geographic coordinates N36-35.30; W118-03.12) serving Inyo County, California, United States. The airport has two runways and is mostly used for general aviation. Charts: San Francisco; L5.

UNICOM/CTAF frequency: 122.8

Facilities 
Lone Pine Airport has two runways:
 Runway 16/34: 4,000 x 60 ft (1,219 x 18 m), surface: asphalt
 Runway 13/31: 2,400 x 100 ft (732 x 30 m), surface: dirt

World War II
During World War II, the airport was used as a contract flying school by the United States Army Air Forces.   The school operated between 1942 and 1944. It also controlled several auxiliary airfields: 

 Adamson Landing Field       
 Independence Auxiliary Field  
 Inyo County Auxiliary Field

See also

 California World War II Army Airfields
 36th Flying Training Wing (World War II)

References 

 Airport Master Record (FAA Form 5010), also available as a printable form (PDF)

External links

Airports in Inyo County, California
Airfields of the United States Army Air Forces in California
USAAF Contract Flying School Airfields
USAAF Western Flying Training Command
American Theater of World War II